Club Deportivo Nacional de Madrid was a Spanish football team based in Madrid, Spain. They were founded in 1924 and dissolved in 1939, playing for seven seasons in total.

History

Club names

 C.D. Madrid (1930)
 C.D. Nacional (1924-1939)

Season to season

 2 season in the Segunda División
 5 season in the Tercera División

External links
 www.rsssf.com

Defunct football clubs in the Community of Madrid
Association football clubs established in 1924
Association football clubs disestablished in 1939
Football clubs in Madrid
1924 establishments in Spain
1939 disestablishments in Spain
Segunda División clubs